The Killing of Randy Webster is a 1981 American made-for-television drama film based on a true story starring Hal Holbrook, Dixie Carter, James Whitmore Jr., Jennifer Jason Leigh and Sean Penn. Fact-based story of a father's tireless investigation into the killing of his teenage son by Houston police in a stolen van chase, prompted by his inability to accept police claims that the boy was carrying a gun.
It originally aired March 11, 1981 on CBS.

Cast
Hal Holbrook as John Webster
Dixie Carter as Billie Webster
James Whitmore Jr. as Officer Vane
Jennifer Jason Leigh as Amy Wheeler
Nancy Malone as Lois Carter
Gary McCleery as Randy Webster
Barry Corbin as Nick Hanson
Sean Penn as Don Fremont

References

External links

Review at New York Times

1981 television films
1981 films
1981 drama films
American drama films
American films based on actual events
CBS network films
Films directed by Sam Wanamaker
1980s American films